Shin-Lamedh-Mem is the triconsonantal root of many Semitic words and many of those words are used as names. The root meaning translates to "whole, safe, intact, unharmed, to go free, without blemish". Its earliest known form is in the name of Shalim, the ancient god of dusk of Ugarit. Derived from this are meanings of "to be safe, secure, at peace", hence "well-being, health"  and passively "to be secured, pacified, submitted".

Central Semitic Š-L-M 
, S-L-M

, Š-L-M
Canaanite: Š-L-M  (c.f. Shalem)
Hebrew: , Š-L-M (Paleo-Hebrew 𐤔-𐤋-𐤌; Samaritan Hebrew ࠔ-ࠋ-ࠌ)
East Semitic S-L-M
South Semitic "S-L-M"
, S-L-M

Arabic , Maltese sliem, Hebrew Shalom, Ge'ez , Syriac šlama (pronounced Shlama, or Shlomo in the Western Syriac dialect) are cognate Semitic terms for 'peace', deriving from a  Proto-Semitic *šalām-.

Given names derived from the same root include Solomon (Süleyman), Absalom, Selim, Salem, Salim, Salma, Salmah, Salman, Selimah, Shelimah, Salome, Szlama (Polish) etc.

Arabic (and by extension Maltese), Hebrew, Ge'ez, and Aramaic have cognate expressions meaning 'peace be upon you' used as a greeting:
 Arabic: As-salāmu ʻalaykum is used to greet others and is an Arabic equivalent of 'hello'. The appropriate response to such a greeting is "and upon you be peace" (wa-ʻalaykum as-salām).
 Maltese: .
Hebrew:  Shālôm ʻalêḵem is the equivalent of the Arabic expression, the response being  ʻAlêḵem shālôm, 'upon you be peace'.
 Ge'ez: Selami ālikayimi
 Neo-Aramaic: Šlama 'lokh, classically, Šlām lakh .

East Semitic
In the Amarna letters, a few of the 382 letters discuss the exchange of "peace gifts", greeting-gifts (Shulmani) between the Pharaoh and the other ruler involving the letter. Examples are Zita (Hittite prince), and Tushratta of Mitanni. Also, Kadashman-Enlil of Babylon, (Karduniaš of the letters).

Šalām (shalamu) is also used in letter introductions to express the authors' health. An example letter EA19, from Tushratta to Pharaoh, states:

"...the king of Mittani, your brother. For me all goes well. For you may all go well." (lines 2-4)

In Akkadian:
 Salimatu "alliance"
 Salimu "peace, concord"
 Shalamu "to be(come) whole, safe; to recover; to succeed, prosper"
 Shulmu "health, well-being"; also a common greeting

Arabic

The Arabic word salām is used in a variety of expressions and contexts in Arabic and Islamic speech and writing.

   'Peace'
   'Peace be upon you'
   'Submission'
   'One who submits'
   – 'Delivering peace – giving a salutation or a submission'
   – 'The act of submitting (oneself), surrenderring'
   – 'One who submits (oneself), surrenders'
   – 'subject of SLM – its SLM, 'the vase is SLM', 'the vase is whole, unbroken'
   – 'undisputed'
 Catholic Church: in the rosary:   'Hail Mary'.

In Maltese:
 Sliem – 'peace'
 Sellem – 'to greet, to salute'

Arabic Islām

The word   is a verbal noun derived from s-l-m, meaning "submission" (i.e. entrusting one's wholeness to a higher force), which may be interpreted as humility.  "One who submits" is signified by the participle ,  (fem.).

The word is given a number of meanings in the Qur'an. In some verses, the quality of Islam as an internal conviction is stressed: "Whomsoever God desires to guide, He expands his breast to Islam." Other verses connect islām and dīn (usually translated as "religion"): "Today, I have perfected your religion for you; I have completed My blessing upon you; I have approved Islam for your religion." Still others describe Islam as an action of returning to God—more than just a verbal affirmation of faith.

Given names

Salam
Salman
Salim
Selim
Suleim
Suleiman

Northwest Semitic

The Koine Greek New Testament text uses eirēnē for 'peace', which perhaps represents Jesus saying šlama; this Greek form became the northern feminine name Irene. In the Epistles, it often occurs alongside the usual Greek greeting chairein in the phrase 'grace and peace'. However, comparison of the Greek Septuagint and Hebrew Masoretic Old Testament texts shows some instances where shalom was translated instead as soteria (meaning 'salvation').

In Hebrew:

 Shalom
 Mushlam – perfect
 Shalem – whole, complete
 Lehashlim – to complete, fill in
 Leshallem – to pay
 Tashlum – payment
 Shillumim – reparations
 Lehishtallem – to be worth it, to "pay"
 Absalom – a personal name, literally means 'Father [of] Peace'.

In Aramaic:
 Shlama – 'peace'
 Shalmuta

Given names
 Shlomi ( or )
 Solomon, Shlomo
 Shlomit 
 Shulamit

See also
Names of Jerusalem

References

External links

Triconsonantal roots